Stanislaw Tillich (born 10 April 1959) is a German politician of the CDU. He served as the 3rd Minister President of Saxony from 2008 to 2017. From 1 November 2015 until 31 October 2016, he was President of the Bundesrat and ex officio deputy to the President of Germany. Tillich is of Sorbian ethnicity and lives in Panschwitz-Kuckau (Pančicy-Kukow), which is 35 kilometres north-east of Dresden near Kamenz.

Early life and education
Born in Neudörfel (Sorbian: Nowa Wjeska) near Kamenz (Sorbian: Kamjenc), Tillich studied construction and drive techniques at the Dresden University of Technology after finishing his Abitur at the Sorbian Gymnasium in Bautzen in 1977. He graduated from university with a Diplomingenieur degree in 1984. Tillich was an employee of the district administration of Kamenz between 1987 and 1989. Later he became an entrepreneur.

Political career
Tillich joined the Christian Democratic Union (East Germany) in 1987 and became a member of the CDU after German reunification in 1990. He was a member of the Volkskammer in 1990 and was delegated as an observer of the European Parliament between 1991 and 1994. He joined the European People's Party and was a member of the European Parliament between 1994 and 1999 where he was the Parliament's rapporteur on the 1998 EU budget.

Tillich has been a minister in the government of Saxony since 1999. He was State Minister for Federal and European Affairs until 2002 when he became State Minister and head of the Staatskanzlei. In 2004 he became the Saxon State Minister for Environment and Agriculture. He became State Minister of Finance in 2007 and has been a member of the Landtag of Saxony since 2004.

Minister-President of Saxony, 2008-2017
Tillich was proposed by Georg Milbradt on 14 April 2008 to become his successor as the Minister-President of Saxony. The Landtag of Saxony elected him on 28 May 2008. He is the first Sorbian head of government in more than thousand years of Sorbian-German coexistence in Saxony.

Together with Günther Oettinger, Dieter Althaus, Maria Böhmer, Peter Hintze, Martina Krogmann and Peter Müller, Tillich co-chaired the CDU’s 2008 national convention in Stuttgart.

In the negotiations to form a coalition government of the Christian Democrats (CDU together with the Bavarian CSU) and the Free Democratic Party (FDP) following the 2009 national elections, Tillich was part of the CDU/CSU delegation in the working group on economic affairs and energy policy, led by Karl-Theodor zu Guttenberg and Rainer Brüderle.

In 2010, news media reported that Michael Kretschmer, the CDU’s general secretary in Saxony, had offered personal meetings with Tillich in exchange for party donations worth €500 to €8,000, or about $680 to $10,900.

From 2010, Tillich was a member of the Christian Democratic Union's 20-strong executive board. By 2012, opinion polls put the backing of Tillich's CDU at 44 percent, at the time the highest level of support in any of the 16 German federal states; this made commentators describe him as “Germany’s second most-powerful politician from the formerly Communist East“ after Chancellor Angela Merkel.

Tillich participated in the exploratory talks between the CDU, CSU and SPD parties to form a coalition government under Merkel following the 2013 federal elections.

Tillich won reelection in the 2014 state elections. Ahead of the elections, he had soon put an end to speculation that he might team up with the newly founded AfD, which the CDU instead attempted to characterize as a fringe movement that flirts with the far right. At the time, Saxony was the first of three eastern regions to hold elections in a two-week span, with Brandenburg and Thuringia later rounding off the first set of electoral since Merkel won a third term.

As one of Saxony's representatives at the Bundesrat, Tillich served as chairman of the Committee on Foreign Affairs from October 2016. In addition, he was a member of the German-Russian Friendship Group set up in cooperation with Russia's Federation Council.

When the AfD overtook the CDU for the first time to emerge as Saxony's most popular party in the 2017 national elections, Tillich resigned and Michael Kretschmer took over.

In 2017, Tillich said that the "People want Germany to stay Germany,".

Life after politics
From 2018 until 2019, Tillich co-chaired the German government's so-called coal commission, which was tasked to develop a masterplan before the end of the year on how to phase-out coal and create a new economic perspective for the country's coal-mining regions.

Tillich was nominated by his party as delegate to the Federal Convention for the purpose of electing the President of Germany in 2022.

Other activities

Corporate boards
 Mitteldeutsche Braunkohlengesellschaft (MIBRAG), chairman of the supervisory board (since 2019)
 Volga-Dnepr Airlines, Advisor (since 2019)

Non-profit organizations
 ZDF, deputy chairman of the board of directors
 Committee for the preparation of the Reformation anniversary 2017, ex officio member of the board of trustees (-2017)
 Leipzig 2015 – 1000th anniversary, member of the board of trustees
 Endowment for Culture of the Free State of Saxony (KdFS), ex officio chairman of the board of trustees (-2017)
 Frauenkirche Dresden Foundation, ex officio member of the board of trustees (-2017)
 Deutsches Museum, member of the board of trustees
 Development and Peace Foundation (SEF), deputy chairman of the board of trustees 
 German Children and Youth Foundation (DKJS), member of the board of trustees
 Max Planck Society, member of the senate
 Peace of Westphalia Prize, member of the jury
 Rotary International, member

Personal life
Besides his native language Upper Sorbian, Tillich speaks fluent German, Czech and Polish. His wife, Veronika, is half-Polish, half-Sorbian. Her father was a forced laborer from Poland who settled in Lusatia after World War II and married a Sorbian woman.
Tillich and his wife have two children.

References

External links 

 Landtag of Saxony: Vita of Stanislaw Tillich MdL 
 Bloomberg: German State Premier Milbradt Quits After SachsenLB

1959 births
Living people
People from Bautzen (district)
People from Bezirk Dresden
Sorbian people
Presidents of the German Bundesrat
Christian Democratic Union (East Germany) politicians
Christian Democratic Union of Germany politicians
Members of the 10th Volkskammer
Ministers-President of Saxony
Members of the Landtag of Saxony
TU Dresden alumni
Recipients of the Order of Merit of the Free State of Saxony